The 1961–62 Western Kentucky Hilltoppers men's basketball team represented Western Kentucky State College (now known as Western Kentucky University) during the 1961-62 NCAA University Division Basketball season. The Hilltoppers were led by Ohio Valley Conference Coach of the Year Edgar Diddle, in his 40th year as coach, and leading scorer Bobby Rascoe, who averaged more than 25 points per game.  The Hilltoppers won the OVC championship, as well as the conference's automatic bid to the 1962 NCAA University Division basketball tournament, where they advanced to the Sweet Sixteen.    
Rascoe, Darel Carrier, and Harry Todd were named to the all-conference team.  Diddle coached his 1000th game at Western on January 6, a victory against New Mexico State.

Schedule

|-
!colspan=6| Regular Season

|-

|-
!colspan=6| 1962 NCAA University Division basketball tournament

References

Western Kentucky Hilltoppers basketball seasons
Western Kentucky State
Western Kentucky State
Western Kentucky State Basketball, Men's
Western Kentucky State Basketball, Men's